Hardy Rawls is a character actor.  In 2003, Adweek, Ad Age, and the New York Post described Rawls' best-known role as that of the father on Nickelodeon's The Adventures of Pete & Pete.  For Maytag's 2004 marketing campaign, Rawls became the third actor to portray Ol' Lonely, replacing the retiring Gordon Jump; Rawls was, in turn, replaced by Richmond, Virginia real estate broker Clay Jackson on April 2, 2007.

Rawls also performed in NBC's 1987 television film Bates Motel as well as the TV series Law & Order, Judging Amy, and Ed.

References

External links
 

20th-century male actors
21st-century male actors
living people
male television actors
place of birth missing (living people)
year of birth missing (living people)